Ise/Orun is a Local Government Area of Ekiti State, Nigeria. Its headquarters are in the town of Ise Ekiti.
 
It has an area of 432 km and a population of 113,754 at the 2006 census.

The postal code of the area is 361.

References

Local Government Areas in Ekiti State